Robert Goldman may refer to:

 Robert Goldman (songwriter) (born 1953), French songwriter
 Bo Goldman (born 1932), real name Robert Goldman, American screenwriter
 Bobby Goldman (1938–1999), American bridge player
 Robert Goldman (inventor) (born 1959), American inventor
 Robert D. Goldman, American biologist, past president of the American Society for Cell Biology
 Robert P. Goldman, American scholar of Sanskrit
 Bob Goldman, sports medicine practitioner, osteopath and publicist: Goldman's dilemma was named after him
 USCGC Robert Goldman (WPC-1142) will be the 42nd Sentinel class cutter